Padrenostro is a 2020 Italian coming-of-age drama film co-written and directed by Claudio Noce. It was selected to be shown in the main competition section of the 77th Venice International Film Festival. At Venice, Pierfrancesco Favino won the Volpi Cup for Best Actor.

The film is loosely based on the 1976 assassination attempt of deputy police commissioner Alfonso Noce, Noce's father, by far-left terrorist group Nuclei Armati Proletari, during the Years of Lead.

Plot
Rome, 1976. 10-years-old Valerio witnesses together with his mother a failed assassination attempt on his father Alfonso by a terrorist commando. From that moment on, fear and a constant sense of vulnerability dramatically mark the feelings of the whole family. That summer, Valerio meets Christian, a boy slightly older than him. Lonely, rebellious, and bold, he seems to have come out of nowhere. Their meeting will change his life forever.

Cast

 Pierfrancesco Favino as Alfonso Le Rose, Valerio's father
  as Gina Le Rose, Valerio's mother
 Mattia Garaci as Valerio Le Rose
  as adult Valerio
 Francesco Gheghi as Christian
  as adult Christian
  as Maria Le Rose, Valerio's grandmother
 Mario Pupella as Giuseppe Le Rose, Valerio's grandfather
 Lea Favino as Alice Le Rose, Valerio's little sister
 Eleonora De Luca as Ketty
  as Francesco, a co-worker of Alfonso
  as Rorò Le Rose, Valerio's uncle

Production
Principal photography began on 29 July 2019 in Rome, moving from early October in Calabria.

Release
The film had its world premiere at the 77th Venice International Film Festival on 4 September 2020. It was released in Italian theaters on 24 September 2020 by Vision Distribution.

Reception
Padrenostro grossed $1.2 million in Italy. On Metacritic, it holds a rating of 51 out of 100, based on 11 critics, indicating "mixed or average reviews".

References

External links
 

2020 films
2020s coming-of-age drama films
2020 drama films
Italian coming-of-age drama films
Italian drama films
2020s Italian-language films
Drama films based on actual events
Coming-of-age films based on actual events
Films about father–son relationships
Films about terrorism in Europe
Films set in 1976
Films set in Calabria
Films set in Rome
Films shot in Rome
Works about the Years of Lead (Italy)
2020s Italian films